He's the Mayor is an American sitcom that aired on ABC from January 10 to March 21, 1986.  It stars Kevin Hooks as a 25-year-old man who is elected mayor of his hometown.

Cast and characters
Kevin Hooks as Mayor Carl Burke
Al Fann as Alvin Burke
David Graf as Councilman Harlan Nash
Wesley Thompson as Wardell Halsey
Margot Rose as Kelly Enright
Stanley Brock as Ivan Bronski
Pat Corley as Chief Walter Padget

List of episodes

References

External links
 

1980s American black sitcoms
1986 American television series debuts
1986 American television series endings
American Broadcasting Company original programming
1980s American political comedy television series
Television series by Universal Television